Acraea bergeri is a butterfly in the family Nymphalidae. It is found in Uganda.

Taxonomy
It is a member of the Acraea oberthueri species group.-   but see also Pierre & Bernaud, 2014

References

Butterflies described in 1915
bergeri
Endemic fauna of Uganda
Butterflies of Africa